Dr. Vivian Chan (born 21 September 1984) is a British-Australian entrepreneur and businesswoman. She is the co-founder and CEO of Sparrho, a London-based startup blending machine learning and expert human curation to democratise science.

Early life 
Born in Hong Kong, Chan's family moved to Australia when she was six-years-old. She grew up going back and forth between Hong Kong and Australia, eventually settling in Australia's Gold Coast. Her parents worked in education and her grandparents in publishing.

Education 
Chan attended Trinity Lutheran College and went on to study biotechnology at the University of Queensland (UQ), achieving a BBiotech (First-Class Honours) in Drug Design and Development. After spending a year working at UQ as an Investment Process Manager in life sciences for the venture fund Uniseed, she received a Cambridge Commonwealth scholarship to study for a PhD in protein crystallography at the University of Cambridge. Whilst at Cambridge, she was voted into the role of president of the Cambridge University Technology & Enterprise Club (CUTEC) from 2010-2011. Chan was still in this role when she was approached by Alice Bentinck and Matthew Clifford of Entrepreneur First, who were seeking to recruit 30 graduates with entrepreneurship ambition. Chan had recently completed her PhD and was a member of the EF student advisory board, so decided to apply "at the last minute" and was selected to take part in EF's first cohort in 2012-13. Here, she met Nilu Satharasinghe, an experienced startup founder with a background in machine learning and a MSc in computer science from the University of Oxford.

Sparrho 
Chan and Satharasinghe founded Sparrho in 2013 as a solution to issues in staying up to date with scientific literature encountered over the course of Chan's biochemistry PhD. Inspiration for Sparrho came from Steve, a postdoctoral researcher in Chan's research lab who would read several key journals and bring paper recommendations to Chan's research group every morning. When Chan described this problem to Satharasinghe, he suggested 'digitising Steve'. This idea grew into the creation of Sparrho, a science research discovery platform combining artificial and human intelligence to help research professionals and layman users stay up-to-date with new scientific publications and patents. Sparrho combines the work of industry experts and artificial intelligence in a three-phase process. Sparrho´s machine learning platform searches amongst over 60 million scientific works, the equivalent of over 80% of all current scientific literature. As of Q2 2017, Sparrho has raised a total of $3 million of funding.

Honours and awards 
In November 2018, Chan was named to the Financial Times' list of the 'Top 100 minority ethnic leaders in technology.'

In 2017, Chan was selected by MIT Technology Review as one of its 35 Innovators Under 35. Executive director of HAG Consulting & Ventures and Startup Grind and jury member for Innovators Under 35 Europe 2017, Rodrigo de Alvarenga, commented that Chan's project "focuses on broadening and levelling out the access to scientific research to anyone interested and, in so doing, democratizing science and innovation through availability."

In 2016, she was named one of the Top 5 Women within the Top 100 Asian Stars in UK Tech.

In 2015, she was named one of Management Today's 35 Women Under 35.

In 2014, she was selected as a semifinalist for The Duke of York (UK) New Entrepreneur of the Year.

Vivian has twice been invited to address EU ministers about the importance of open data for innovation, in 2015 and 2016.

She has been invited to No. 10 Downing Street multiple times, and sits on the Department for Digital, Culture, Media and Sport's Digital Economy Advisory Group alongside Matt Hancock, Minister of State for Digital.

References 

British women chief executives
Australian women chief executives
1984 births
Living people
Hong Kong people
University of Queensland alumni
Alumni of the University of Cambridge